3A, 3-A or III-A may refer to:

 3A (Band), a German pop band
 Long March 3A, a Chinese rocket
 Northern Nevada 3A Region, a part of the Nevada Interscholastic Athletics Association governing the northern half of Nevada for high school athletics
 Route 3A (disambiguation)
 Stalag III-A, a German prisoner of war camp

See also
A3 (disambiguation)